Ustad Bade Inayat Hussain Khan (1837–1923) was a classical Indian vocalist who belonged to the famous Gwalior Gharana. He was the son of Haddu Khan who was the maternal grandson of  Nathan Pir Bakhsh, the founder of Gwalior Gharana. He was the first person to introduce Bol Bant in Khayal Gayki. His Khayal Gayki is used in all the Gharanas. Haddu Khan's son Bade Inayat Hussain Khan (1852–1922) was a singer who expanded the Gwalior style from the methodical form it followed to the emotional style that he preferred.

The most significant changes in the parampara came from around the late 18th century onward during the Chandra Gupta phase of Indian Nationalism, following the migration of Nathan Khan Peer Baksh from Lucknow to Gwalior. His grandsons, Haddu Khan and Hassu Khan, evolved the genre of khayal into its present structure and popularised it.  Haddu Khan’s son, Inayat Hussain Khan was the first to introduced Bol Bant in Khayal Gayki.

Gwalior gharana of Indian classical music is easily the doyen amongst Khayal gharanas.
 
His son Ustad Qurban Hussain Khan continued his legacy and received the title of Raj Gayak.

References

External links

Hindustani singers
20th-century Indian male classical singers
20th-century Khyal singers
19th-century Indian male classical singers